Shadi, also spelt Chadi or Shady, in Arabic means seeker of knowledge.
Shadi (Persian: شادی) is a Persian female given name. The name translates to "happiness" or "joy" in English.

Given name
 Shadi Abdalla
 Shadi Amin
 Shadi A. Karam
 Shadi Abdel Salam, Egyptian film director
 Shadi Bartsch, American academic
 Shadi Beg
 Shady El Nahas, Canadian judoka
 Shadi Ghadirian
 Shadi Hamid
 Chadi Hammami, Tunisian footballer
 Shadi Hedayati
 Shadi Jamil
 Chadi Cheikh Merai, Syrian footballer
 Shadi Paridar, Iranian chess player
 Shadi Sadr, Iranian women's rights activist
 Shadi Shaban

Surname
 Abdelkader Chadi, Algerian boxer
 Mohsen Shadi, Iranian rower

See also
 Chadi Jawani Budhe Nu, Indian Punjabi movie

Arabic masculine given names
Persian feminine given names